Conus nucleus is a species of sea snail, a marine gastropod mollusk in the family Conidae, the cone snails and their allies.

Like all species within the genus Conus, these snails are predatory and venomous. They are capable of "stinging" humans, therefore live ones should be handled carefully or not at all.

Description
The size of the shell varies between 16 mm and 25 mm. The shell shows fine revolving striae. Its color is orange-brown, with an irregular white band, and spots. The aperture is violaceous.

Distribution
This marine species occurs off the Mascarene Islands, Madagascar, the Philippines, the Maldives, Thailand, Guam, the Marshall Islands and off Australia (Northern Territory, Queensland and Western Australia).

References

 Reeve, L.A. 1848. Monograph of the genus Conus. supp. pls 1–3 in Reeve, L.A. (ed). Conchologia Iconica. London : L. Reeve & Co. Vol. 1.
 Wilson, B. 1994. Australian Marine Shells. Prosobranch Gastropods. Kallaroo, WA : Odyssey Publishing Vol. 2 370 pp.
 Röckel, D., Korn, W. & Kohn, A.J. 1995. Manual of the Living Conidae. Volume 1: Indo-Pacific Region. Wiesbaden : Hemmen 517 pp.
 Tucker J.K. & Tenorio M.J. (2009) Systematic classification of Recent and fossil conoidean gastropods. Hackenheim: Conchbooks. 296 pp.
 Puillandre N., Duda T.F., Meyer C., Olivera B.M. & Bouchet P. (2015). One, four or 100 genera? A new classification of the cone snails. Journal of Molluscan Studies. 81: 1–23

External links
 The Conus Biodiversity website
 Cone Shells – Knights of the Sea
 

nucleus
Gastropods described in 1848